Leah Ravid Horowitz (Zimri) (לאה הורביץ זמרי; also "Lea" and "-Simri"; 9 March 1933 – 5 December 1956) was an Israeli former Olympic hurdler.

She was born in Pforzheim, Baden-Württemberg, Germany, and was Jewish.

Hurdling career
Her personal best in the 80 metre hurdles was 12.74, in 1952.

She competed for Israel at the 1952 Summer Olympics in Helsinki at the age of 19. In the Women's 80 metres Hurdles she came in 6th in Heat 4 with a time of 12.4 (an Israeli record).

See also
Sports in Israel

References 

Sportspeople from Pforzheim
Jewish female athletes (track and field)
Athletes (track and field) at the 1952 Summer Olympics
Israeli female hurdlers
Olympic athletes of Israel
German emigrants to Israel
1933 births

1956 deaths